Daimler is a German surname. It may refer to:

People
 Gottlieb Daimler (1834–1900), German inventor, industrialist and namesake of a series of automobile companies
 Adolf Daimler (1871–1913), engineer and son of Gottlieb Daimler 
 Paul Daimler (1869–1945), engineer and son of Gottlieb Daimler

Places
 Mount Daimler, a peak in Antarctica named after Gottlieb Daimler

Companies

Germany
 Daimler AG, the past name of the Mercedes-Benz Group from 2007 to 2022, known to the public as Mercedes-Benz, formerly known as Daimler-Benz AG (1926–1998) and DaimlerChrysler AG (1998–2007)
 Daimler Mobility, banking and credit/debit card services subsidiary renamed as Mercedes-Benz Mobility in 2022.
 Daimler Truck, demerged in 2021
 Daimler Truck North America, formerly Freightliner Corporation, Portland, Oregon
 Daimler India Commercial Vehicles, a subsidiary based in Chennai, India
 Daimler Buses North America, subsidiary in Greensboro, North Carolina, US
 Daimler Motoren Gesellschaft (DMG), original maker of the Mercedes brand (1890–1926); merged with Benz & Cie. in 1926

Austria
 Austro-Daimler, an Austrian subsidiary (1899–1909) independent after 1909
 Steyr-Daimler-Puch, a group including Austro-Daimler after it was sold to Steyr-Werke AG (1934–2001)

France
 Panhard-Daimler

United Kingdom
 Daimler Company, a manufacturer of cars, trucks and buses in Coventry, England (1896–1960)
 Daimler Airway, an airline subsidiary (1921–1924)
 Daimler Hire, a limousine service subsidiary (1919–1976)

United States
 Daimler Manufacturing Company, an attempted American manufacturer of cars under license from Daimler (1888–1907) in New York City
 Daimler-Chrysler America; an era of the company Chrysler, one of the Big 3 automotive companies of North America

Vehicles
Gottlieb Daimler vehicles:
 Daimler Motorized Carriage, the first automobile produced by Gottlieb Daimler and Wilhelm Maybach in 1892
 Daimler Stahlradwagen, the second automobile made by Gottlieb Daimler in 1892
 Daimler Reitwagen, a two-wheeled vehicle produced by Gottlieb Daimler in 1885 and widely recognized as the first motorcycle
Daimler Company vehicles:
 List of Daimler cars
 Daimler Armoured Car, a British armored vehicle of World War II
 Daimler Dingo, a British light reconnaissance vehicle of World War II
 Daimler Roadliner
 Daimler Fleetline
 Daimler Freeline

See also